Million Dollar Listing New York is an American reality television series that premiered on Bravo on March 7, 2012. The show follows the lives of several luxury real estate agents as they represent property owners in New York's five boroughs. It is a spin-off of Million Dollar Listing Los Angeles.

The success of the show has resulted in two Emmy Awards nominations.

Current realtors
Main
 Fredrik Eklund, 2012—2021
 Ryan Serhant, 2012—2021
 Steve Gold, 2017—2021
 Tyler Whitman, 2019—2021
 Kirsten Jordan, 2021

Production
In April 2010, World of Wonder productions started seeking real estate agents within New York City for a Million Dollar Listing spin-off. The official series debut date was announced on January 27, 2012, with Michael Lorber (son of Howard Lorber), Ryan Serhant and Fredrik Eklund as the original cast. Serhant, then the Executive Vice President and Managing Director at Nest Seekers International, was added to the cast last minute replacing another potential cast member Eklund left CORE Group, another broker firm, for Prudential Douglas Elliman in order to be on the series. The first season averaged 1.04 million total viewers.

In 2012, Andy Cohen announced on Watch What Happens Live that the series had been renewed for a second season. Bravo officially renewed the series for a second season which debuted on May 8, 2013, with cast member Luis D. Ortiz replacing Michael Lorber who chose not to return due to the series not improving his business. The same year, Serhant launched his bi-coastal brokerage team, The Serhant Team.

Million Dollar Listing New York was renewed for a third season on August 1, 2013. Season 3 premiered on April 2, 2014, with the full second-season cast returning. The third season finale was the highest-rated episode of the season with 1.3 million total viewers.

In 2014, the show was nominated for an Emmy award in the Outstanding Unstructured Reality Program category. On July 14, 2014, Million Dollar Listing New York was renewed for a fourth season, which premiered on April 15, 2015. The same year, the show was nominated for a second Emmy award in the same category. The fifth season of the series premiered on April 21, 2016. In July 2016, Luis Ortiz announced his departure from the show. On October 27, 2016, the show was renewed for a sixth season. During the show's sixth season, Serhant's 2016 wedding to Emily Bechrakis was chronicled in a four-part mini-series, Million Dollar Listing New York: Ryan’s Wedding. In 2017, MDLNY spun-off its own show, Sell it Like Serhant on Bravo starring Serhant. In April 2018, the show was renewed for a seventh season. The seventh season premiered on June 11, 2018 and the finale episode  aired on September 4, 2018.

On June 10, 2019, the series was renewed for an eighth season which premiered on August 1, 2019.

The ninth season of the series was announced in March 2021 and premiered on May 6, 2021, with broker Kirsten Jordan joining the cast.

On January 24, 2022, Fredrik Eklund announced his departure from the Million Dollar Listing franchise.

On July 5, 2022, the series was canceled after nine seasons.

Realtors
The current cast consists of Fredrik Eklund, Ryan Serhant, Steve Gold, Tyler Whitman and Kirsten Jordan. Previously featured realtors include Michael Lorber and Luis D. Ortiz.

Realtor timeline

Episodes

Season 1 (2012)

Season 2 (2013)

Season 3 (2014)

Season 4 (2015)

Season 5 (2016)

Ryan's Wedding (2016)

Season 6 (2017)

Season 7 (2018)

Season 8 (2019)

Season 9 (2021)

Broadcast
Internationally, the series premiered in Australia on September 25, 2016 on Arena. In the United Kingdom, the series is shown on ITVBe and via Amazon Prime Video and Hayu.

References

External links
 
 
 

2010s American reality television series
2020s American reality television series
2012 American television series debuts
2021 American television series endings
English-language television shows
Bravo (American TV network) original programming
Reality television spin-offs
Television shows set in New York City
Television series by World of Wonder (company)
Property buying television shows
American television spin-offs